Giangentile di Lorenzo, (active 16th century) was an Italian painter. Along with his two brothers, Antonio and Sanseverino, he learned his craft initially from his father the painter Lorenzo d'Alessandro of Sanseverino. In the town of Sanseverino, Ricci claims they likely came in contact with Pinturicchio. Antonio and Giangentile painted a Madonna and St Martin (1560) for the San Severino Cathedral; the also painted for the church of Santa Maria Assunta, Sarnano. Giangentile also painted a Madonna and Child for the church of the Madonna dei Lumi, San Severino Marche. He is said to have died in 19 December 1576.

Notes

Italian Renaissance painters
16th-century Italian painters
Italian male painters
Year of birth unknown
1576 deaths